Rodney Clark may refer to:
 Rodney Clark Donalds, Panamanian musician
 Rodney Clark, a short-time musician for The Moody Blues

See also 
 Rodney Clarke, Australian ice dancer